One North Wacker, UBS Tower is a 50-story skyscraper at One North Wacker Drive in downtown Chicago, Illinois. The tower was built from 1999 to 2002 to accommodate Swiss investment bank UBS AG's Chicago headquarters. Originally UBS Tower, as it was solely known then, housed four different branches of the bank including its investment banking, wealth management advisory, asset management, and private banking businesses.

It was designed by Lohan Associates (now Goettsch Partners) and developed by John Buck Company.

Building
The UBS Tower was the first large multi-tenant tower to be constructed in Chicago for six years since 1993.

Architecture
The tower's main lobby's glass wall was a first in the United States. The  wall was made out of 5' x 5' glass panes attached to a system of medallions and cable. This cable system was tested at pressures above 150 psf, or a wind speed of nearly 250 mph. The glass itself is also noteworthy: an optical interference anti-reflective glass (designed by Schott AG) with an unusually low surface reflectivity of 1% is used. This imbues the lobby with an almost transparent appearance.

Exterior landscaping was designed by the Berkeley, California-based firm, Peter Walker and Partners Landscape Architecture Inc.

Enclos, a facade engineering and curtain wall design company, designed and installed the first ever cable net glass wall in the United States at the lobby area of One North Wacker in downtown Chicago. The cable net strategy developed effectively minimized the sightlines of the steel support structure supporting the glass, allowing architect Goettsch Partners to achieve maximum transparency with a series of 15 meter glass facades that wrap the perimeter of the lobby space in over 1,500 square meters of glass.

Artwork
Artwork throughout the building is drawn from the UBS PaineWebber Collection of contemporary art pieces and from the UBS Global Asset Management collection of architectural relics. Roy Lichtenstein's sculpture, Archaic Head, is displayed on the 38th floor near Louis Sullivan's elevator gate, claimed from the old Chicago Stock Exchange.

Use
With  of floorspace, UBS Tower's rents are among the highest per square foot of any building in the Chicago Metropolitan Area at an average of over $25 per square foot on a triple net basis, grossing up to over $40 per square foot. The building amenities also include a two-story underground garage for senior executives, One North Kitchen and Bar, a Conference Center, Fitness Center and Convenience Store. The building also has a cafeteria on the 30th floor, which serves a range of traditional and contemporary American cuisine as well as other cuisine featured from around the world on a rotating basis.

Awards
In March 2002, the building was recognized as "Development of the Year” at the 14th Annual Greater Chicago Commercial Real Estate Awards.

Major tenants 

UBS AG
Stifel
Barnes & Thornburg LLP
L.E.K. Consulting
Northwestern Mutual
PwC
Resolution Economics
Sedgwick Detert Moran & Arnold LLP

See also
List of skyscrapers
List of tallest buildings in the United States
List of tallest buildings in Chicago
World's tallest structures

References

External links
One North Wacker at Hines Interests Limited Partnership
One North Wacker Architecture at Enclos

Skyscraper office buildings in Chicago
Hines Interests Limited Partnership
2002 establishments in Illinois
Office buildings completed in 2002